Dead Babies (Mood Swingers for US release) is a 2000 British film directed by William Marsh. It is based on the 1975 novel of the same name by Martin Amis.

Plot 
When a group of young English friends, living together in a bizarre house just outside of London, invite three Americans over for a drug fuelled weekend, things really kick off.

As the two cultures collide and the chemicals take over, it soon becomes apparent that one of the weekend guests is a member of a newly formed net-based terrorist group, The Conceptualists, whose underlying principle is extreme violence for its own sake.

It also becomes apparent that the assembled guests are the next intended victims for the Group's website.

Cast
 Paul Bettany as Quentin
 Katy Carmichael as Lucy Littlejohn
 Hayley Carr as Roxanne
 Charlie Condou as Giles
 Alexandra Gilbreath as Cecilia
 William Marsh as Marvel
 Kris Marshall as Skip
 Andy Nyman as Keith
 Cristian Solimeno as Andy
 Olivia Williams as Diana

Reception

Critical reception
The film, which was badly received, was reviewed in the British newspaper The Guardian which described it as "boring, embarrassing, nasty and stupid - and not in a good way".

References

External links
 

2000 films
2000 drama films
British drama films
Films about drugs
Films based on British novels
2000s English-language films
2000s British films